Raffi Boghosian (born March 31, 1990) is an Arabic producer, writer, and television host of Armenian descent. He lives and works in Hollywood, California. Boghosian is the owner of Boghos Entertainment LLC, a Los Angeles-based production company that has produced a variety of shows for the Middle Eastern market. While he produces shows, he is also a writer for Al Arabiya English.

Early life and family
He was born in mousel-iraq to a large, well-known Arabic business family. He and his family moved from iraq to Syria when he was a young child, and the family later moved to Amman, Jordan. Later, Boghosian moved to Los Angeles. His passion for entertainment news began at the early age of 16 while attending Oxford Schools. Shortly into his career, he was voted Most Popular Youth Presenter in the Middle East in 2009. Boghosian earned his Bachelor of Arts in Business Administration, from the University of La Verne.

Career
Boghosian began his career in 2011 as a News Correspondent for Middle East Broadcasting Center, a Dubai-based satellite television network. Here, his stories and interviews were seen by an enormous Arabic-speaking audience. He worked for that network until 2015, when he began conducting interviews with Al Arabiya, an MBC sister company.

Currently, aside from producing shows for the Middle Eastern market, Boghosian is a Hollywood news correspondent for the Middle East Network/Al-Arabiya. His stories and interviews reach a large, worldwide Arabic-speaking audience. In this role, he primarily covers entertainment and celebrity news. During this career, he has the opportunity to interview stars as diverse as Cristiano Ronaldo, David Beckham, Arnold Schwarzenegger, Emma Stone, Al Pacino, Jean Claude van Damme, Steven Spielberg, James Franco, Gerrard Butler, and Larry King, among others.

Memberships
Outside of film and entertainment, Boghosian has been a member of the U.S. Department of State – Foreign Affairs Centers since 2014. He was also awarded the U.S. Senate and House of Representatives press badges. In addition, he is a member of the Los Angeles Press Club and the Motion Picture Association of America.

References

External links
 

American television journalists
Living people
1990 births
Iraqi emigrants to the United States